Bird language refers to birds' system of communication. It may also refer to:

 "The Bird Language", a short story by Pu Songling, first published in 1740, about a monk who can communicate with birds
 Language of the birds, a mythical language by which humans can communicate with birds
 "The Language of the Birds", a Russian fairy tale
 Turkish bird language, a whistled version of the Turkish language used by farmers to communicate over long distances

See also 

 Language of the birds (disambiguation)
 The Secret Language of Birds, a 2000 progressive rock album by Ian Anderson
 Whistled language